"Torn" is a song written by Scott Cutler, Anne Preven, and Phil Thornalley. It was first recorded in 1993 in Danish (renamed "", Danish for "Burnt") by Danish singer Lis Sørensen, then in 1994 by Cutler and Preven's American rock band Ednaswap, and in 1996 by American-Norwegian singer Trine Rein.

"Torn" is best known as Australian singer Natalie Imbruglia's 1997 debut single. Her version was produced by Thornalley and peaked at number one on the singles charts of Belgium, Canada, Denmark, Iceland, Spain, and Sweden, as well as on three US Billboard charts. Imbruglia's version sold over four million copies worldwide.

Original version
"Torn" was written in 1991 by Scott Cutler and Anne Preven with producer Phil Thornalley as a solo song for Preven. Cutler and Preven's band Ednaswap performed it live, but did not initially release a recording.

Ednaswap released a recorded version in 1995. The song followed the single "Glow" from their self-titled debut album. Thornalley and Cutler produced the session. The band later released several variations and remixes of the song as B-sides and on their album Wacko Magneto.

Lis Sørensen version in Danish
The first release recording of the song was in 1993 by the Danish singer Lis Sørensen as "Brændt" ("Burnt"). It was featured on her album Under stjernerne et sted ("Somewhere Below the Stars"), and was also a radio single. It became a hit in Denmark. Sørensen had received the song through music producer , as a suggestion for inclusion on her new album.

Trine Rein version

A version of the song was recorded in 1996 by American-Norwegian singer Trine Rein and released on her second album, Beneath My Skin (1996). Rein's version reached number 10 on the Norwegian chart. A music video was also produced to promote this version.

Natalie Imbruglia version

In 1997, Australian singer and actress Natalie Imbruglia, working with Thornalley, covered the song for her debut studio album, Left of the Middle (1997). Imbruglia's version was recorded in Kilburn, London, with David Munday (lead guitar), Thornalley (bass, rhythm guitars), Chuck Sabo (drums), Henry Binns, Sam Hardaker (Zero 7) (drum programming) and Katrina Leskanich (background vocals). It was mixed by Nigel Godrich. Released as a single, Imbruglia's version became a worldwide hit.

For the song, Imbruglia received a Grammy Award nomination for Best Female Pop Vocal Performance, losing to Celine Dion's "My Heart Will Go On". The accompanying music video for "Torn" features British actor Jeremy Sheffield.

Imbruglia also recorded an acoustic version of the song in 2001 for MTV Unplugged. The sheet music for "Torn" is published in the key of F major.

Critical reception
Larry Flick from Billboard described the song as a "shuffling, acoustic-lined rocker", noting that it "has the rich texture and guitar flavor needed to win the props of rock radio." He added, "However, the song also has an infectious melody that will warm the heart of anyone with a hankering for a slice of pure pop. Imbruglia has a charming, heartfelt delivery mildly reminiscent of Jewel." Scottish newspaper Daily Record commented, "Gorgeous tune from a gorgeous lady". A reviewer from Music & Media stated that "this very convincing debut single" has taken the U.K. charts by storm, "and looks likely to do so elsewhere." Music Week rated it five out of five, picking it as Single of the Week. They wrote, "The former Neighbours star possesses a sweet voice and this song — produced by Nigel Godrich (Radiohead) — has a gentle beauty. Should be huge." The magazine's Alan Jones viewed it as an "excellent single", adding, "A star is reborn."

In 2013, "Torn" was declared the "Best Pop Song" on a top 10 list, part of a larger collection of songs by Q magazine in their special edition 1001 Best Songs Ever issue. In 2013, Billboard ranked "Torn" the number 26 Biggest Pop Song based only on pop radio charts compiled between 1992 and 2012. In 2005, "Torn" was listed at number 383 on Blender magazine's list of "500 Greatest Songs Since You Were Born".

Chart performance
The physical single of Imbruglia's version of the song has sold more than 4 million copies worldwide, including more than 1 million copies in the UK alone. In the UK, it is the 85th biggest selling single of all time. The track peaked at number two for three weeks, from 2 to 22 November 1997, and then dropped to number four, it broke the airplay record in the UK (more than 2000 plays) for six weeks and was number one for fourteen weeks in the UK radio chart. On 24 September 2007, Natalie Imbruglia's version of the song re-entered the UK Singles Chart at number 70, on the strength of digital sales after her greatest hits album was released. In the Flanders region of Belgium, the single peaked at a number one for 7 consecutive weeks and charted for 22 weeks.

In the United States, the song peaked at number one on the Hot 100 Airplay chart for 11 consecutive weeks. However, as a result of rules preventing tracks which had not been released as physical singles from charting on the Billboard Hot 100, the song did not chart there during its peak of popularity in the United States. When the song was declining in popularity, the rules changed to allow airplay-only songs onto the chart, and the song charted for 2 weeks, peaking at number 42. In Canada, it peaked at number one on the RPM Top Singles chart for 12 nonconsecutive weeks, from 13 April to 8 June and 22 June to 6 July 1998. It was the most successful single of the year there.
 
In the Forbes list of the UK's 40 most-played songs of the 2010s, "Torn" was at number 40, and the only 1990s song in the list. It was the 19th-most-played song from 2000 to 2009 in the UK. In 2009, News.com.au reported that it was the most played song on Australian radio since 1990, played more than 300,500 times since its 1997 release, an average of 75 times a day, based on data compiled by the Australian Performing Rights Association (APRA).

Music video
The music video to Natalie Imbruglia's cover version, filmed on 25 October 1997 under the direction of Alison Maclean, features a shot of an apartment where the angle of vision never changes. Shots of Imbruglia singing along with the song are interspersed with footage of her and British actor Jeremy Sheffield engaging in a romantically inclined conversation. These few scenes turn out to be B-roll footage, as the two actors are seen fumbling their lines and positions; and the director constantly steps into frame to redirect the two. During the last chorus, the apartment walls start wobbling and the crew comes to dismantle it, revealing the location to be a set inside a soundstage. Imbruglia begins to dance during the finishing guitar solo as her "world" crumbles around her.

The song was pantomimed by David Armand for a 2005 HBO broadcast which spread on the internet. This popularity of the "Karaoke for the Deaf" performance by Armand as Johan Lippowitz resulted in the 2006 live performance (Amnesty International's Secret Policeman's Ball) with Imbruglia where she sings "Torn" and then joins into the  "interpretive dance" pantomime featuring both Armand and Imbruglia acting out the words of the song.

Track listings
Australian CD single and UK CD1

UK CD2

UK cassette single

European CD single

Charts

Weekly charts

Year-end charts

All-time charts

Certifications

Release history

Rouge version

In 2005, Brazilian girl group Rouge recorded a Portuguese version of the song, titled "O Amor é Ilusão" (lit.: "Love is an illusion"), included in the group's 2005 fourth studio album Mil e Uma Noites. It was the album's second and last single, and their last overall until "Bailando" in 2018.

The lyrics were written by Milton Guedes, who co-wrote their hits "Não Dá pra Resistir", "Beijo Molhado", and others, with production by Rick Bonadio.

Background
After three studio albums, their record label Sony BMG demanded a compilation album, against the band members' wishes. At the time, rumors of their breakup circulated in the press, and they felt a new release would help dispel those allegations. Mil e Uma Noites was eventually released as a compromise, with most tracks being previously released hits, plus six all-new tracks.

As always, the album featured songs originally in English rewritten for Portuguese, including "Torn". After the success of the album's first single "Vem Habib (Wala Wala)", "O Amor é Ilusão" was announced as the follow-up and released in late September.

This version keeps most of the original's lyrical themes, about a lost love who gradually drifts away from the narrator.

Charts

In popular culture
The song appeared in several television series, the most prominent of which being the American TV series Charmed, in the episode "I've Got You Under My Skin". Imbruglia's version of the song appeared in other shows as well; examples include the Chilean soap opera Separados (broadcast by TVN), the Turkish teen drama Love 101 (broadcast and distributed by Netflix), and the Philippine TV series Gimik (aired by ABS-CBN).

In 2010, British-Irish boyband One Direction sang an acoustic version of "Torn" for their first performance as a group on The X Factor. The group would perform the song again in November 2015 on BBC Radio 1's Live Lounge, this time as a quartet following Zayn Malik's departure earlier in the year.

In 2018, Welsh pop punk band Neck Deep covered the song, with an accompanying music video that parodies Natalie Imbruglia's 1997 video.

References

1990s ballads
1993 songs
1995 songs
1995 singles
1997 debut singles
2005 singles
ARIA Award-winning songs
Bertelsmann Music Group singles
Columbia Records singles
East West Records singles
Natalie Imbruglia songs
Number-one singles in Denmark
Number-one singles in Iceland
Number-one singles in Spain
Number-one singles in Sweden
Rouge (group) songs
Portuguese-language songs
Pop ballads
RCA Records singles
Rock ballads
RPM Top Singles number-one singles
Songs about heartache
Songs written by Anne Preven
Songs written by Phil Thornalley
Songs written by Scott Cutler
Song recordings produced by Phil Thornalley
Sony BMG singles
Ultratop 50 Singles (Flanders) number-one singles
Alternative rock ballads
Ednaswap songs